Killer is the fourth and final studio album by Swamp Terrorists, released on March 25, 1996 by Cyberware Productions. The band expanded their membership during the recording sessions with the inclusion of bassist Andrej A., percussionist Piet H. and guitarist Spring.

Reception
A critic for Sonic Boom described Killer as being the band's most consistent album since Grow – Speed – Injection, saying "instead of focusing on a handful of filler tracks and remixes as in the past, the majority of the album consists of full length original songs, thereby choosing to relegate the fluff to a more appropriate remix album. Despite criticizing Swamp Terrorists for not growing musically Sonic Boom gave the album a positive review, noting that "the same zany lyrical style and freaked out power guitar chords are still present along with more than their fair share of pulsating dance electronics which seem to keep the Swampies a favorite in clubs."

Track listing

Personnel
Adapted from the Killer liner notes.

Swamp Terrorists
 Andrej A. – bass guitar
 Michael Antener (as STR) – sampler
 Piet H. – drum programming
 Ane Hebeisen (as Ane H.) – lead vocals, cover art, illustrations, photography
 Spring – guitar

Additional musicians
 Mike Belac – guitar (6)
 DJ Dave – scratching (3)
 Dan Schilliger – guitar (9)

Production and design
 Bern – recording, mixing
 Glenn Miller – mastering
 FM – typesetting
 Stögu – typesetting

Release history

References

External links 
 

1996 albums
Swamp Terrorists albums
Metropolis Records albums